MDCC-Arena is a multi-purpose stadium in Magdeburg, Germany. It has been completed and opened to the public in December 2006, replacing the old Ernst-Grube-Stadion. It is mostly used for football matches and hosts the home matches of 1. FC Magdeburg.

Stadium Facts 
The stadium is a fully covered football-only stadium, i.e. without an athletics track. It has a capacity of 25,910 people. The stadium has 64 seats for persons with disabilities. Furthermore, 40 press seats are available. The maximum distance from the pitch is 32 meters. The floodlight is attached to the stadium's roof, as well as the two 30m2 screens. Total cost of construction was 31 million Euros. In the 2016–17 3. Liga season, Magdeburg drew the highest average home attendance (17,100), followed by MSV Duisburg (14,175) and Hansa Rostock (11,433).

History
The first stadium at this location had been inaugurated on 14 April 1912 as the home of SV Victoria 96 Magdeburg. In 1914, it hosted the final to the German championship between Spielvereinigung Fürth and VfB Leipzig. In 1937 it was bought by the Allianz insurance company after Victoria had gone bankrupt. During World War II the stadium was completely destroyed by bombing.
 
After World War II the city of Magdeburg planned to erect a sports center consisting among others of a stadium with a capacity for 80,000 people and a natatorium. However, the city was unable to acquire the site originally intended and so the project was abandoned. Instead, the city decided to build a new stadium east of the Elbe river, at the site of the Victoria stadium. In order to erect the stands, about 5.3 million cubic ft of rubble were transported from the ruins of the city. The stadium was equipped with an athletics track and was opened in front of a crowd of 40,000 on 18 September 1955. Over the years, it was upgraded several times, parts of the stands were put under a roof, and floodlights were installed. However, after the reunification of Germany the stadium fell into disrepair and in 2004 the city council decided to build a new one at the same site. The Ernst-Grube-Stadion was demolished between March and June 2005, and construction of the new stadium began on 4 July 2005.

The first match was held on 19 December 2006. In front of a crowd of 13,279, hosts 1. FC Magdeburg came to a nil-all draw against Eintracht Braunschweig. In the inaugural match, 1. FC Magdeburg lost 0–3 to Bundesliga side SV Werder Bremen, this time 24,300 spectators had come. In the remaining matches of the season, 10,800 spectators came to see 1. FC Magdeburg play on average. The first international match was held on 29 July 2007 when the German women's national team beat their Danish counterparts 4–0 in front of 10,735 spectators.

In 2009, the stadium hosted the 2009 UEFA European Under-17 Football Championship final.

In July 2009, local ISP and cable TV company MDCC announced they had signed a five-year sponsorship agreement with the stadium operator under which the stadium would be known as MDCC-Arena.

On 20 October 2010, the American Football Verband Deutschland e.V. announced that the German Bowl, the championship game of the German Football League – an American football competition, would be held in the MDCC-Arena for three iterations, beginning with the 2011 championship.

The kick-off spot grass patch from the 2014–15 Regionalliga promotion round match against Kickers Offenbach on 27 May 2015, was auctioned on eBay on 30 May 2016. The money raised was used for the development of 1. FC Magdeburg's youth team.

Following a refurbishment of the guest terraces and seating in early 2016, the stadium capacity was reduced to 25,910, including 21,510 seats.

Gallery

References

Football venues in Germany
1. FC Magdeburg
Buildings and structures in Magdeburg
Multi-purpose stadiums in Germany
Sports venues in Saxony-Anhalt
2006 establishments in Germany
Sports venues completed in 2006
Tourist attractions in Magdeburg